The United States Armed Forces authorize certain medal and ribbon devices that may be worn if authorized on a defined set of United States military decorations and awards. The devices vary between  inch to  inch in size and are usually attached to suspension and service ribbons of medals and to unit award ribbons. The devices are usually made of brass or metal alloys that appear gold, silver, or bronze in color with either a dull or polished look. The devices may denote additional awards of the same decoration or award, an award for valor or meritorious combat service, participation in a particular campaign, periods of honorable service, specific events, and other special meanings. These are sometimes referred to as award devices, but are most commonly referred to in service regulations and Department of Defense instructions simply as "devices" for awards and decorations.

On January 7, 2016, the Secretary of Defense approved two new devices for medals and ribbons: a "C" Device which will be affixed to multi-purpose performance awards in recognition of meritorious service under combat conditions and, an "R" Device which will be affixed to non-combat performance awards to specifically recognize remote but direct impact on combat operations. The "R" device is to be a bronze letter "R",  inch in size. Both of the devices will be worn if authorized for wear, on specific decorations. The services have a year to implement these changes.

The following is a list of U.S. military service devices for medals and ribbons:

Examples of service ribbons with devices
The following are examples of various devices affixed to different service ribbons:

 Unit awards

References 

Award devices